Geylang East Public Library is one of the 26 public libraries established by the National Library Board of Singapore.

Located along Geylang East Avenue 1 within walking distance of Aljunied MRT station, it serves the residents of the Eastern areas of Aljunied, Geylang East, Geylang West, Geylang Serai, Jalan Besar, Eunos, Kampong Ubi, Kallang, MacPherson, Lavender, Kaki Bukit and Sims Drive.

History

Geylang East Community Library was officially opened on 26 July 1988 by Wong Kan Seng, then Minister for Community Development and Second Minister for Foreign Affairs. The library was closed on 18 March 2002 for the installation of the new Electronic Library Management System, and was officially reopened on 29 April that year. Its name was changed to Geylang East Public Library in 2008.

Layout
Covering an area of 3,817 m2, the library spans three levels and serves the residents of the Eastern areas of Aljunied, Geylang East, Geylang West, Geylang Serai, Jalan Besar, Eunos, Kampong Ubi, Kallang, MacPherson, Lavender, Kaki Bukit and Sims Drive.

First floor
Children's collection
Parenting collection
Storytelling room

Second floor
Young people's collection
Adult non-fiction
Adult fiction
Magazines

Third floor
Exhibition halls
Meeting rooms
200-seat auditorium

References

External links 
 National Library Board

1988 establishments in Singapore
Libraries established in 1988
Library buildings completed in 1988
Libraries in Singapore
Geylang
20th-century architecture in Singapore